In baseball, inside pitching is a tactic used by pitchers. It involves throwing a pitch close to the batter to make it more difficult to swing their bat, and result in making less solid contact, known as "jamming the hitter." Pitchers with good control are usually more likely to pitch effectively on the inside. It is possible to be effective at disrupting the hitter while also being in the strike zone. When employed correctly, this can result in making a hitter hit pop flys or weak ground balls; also, rarely, it causes them to break bats. Depending on the exact height, location, and/or type of pitch, it can result in a brushback pitch, or, in the case of a badly controlled pitch, a hit batter. Despite the dangers that it poses to batters, it is a common and legal tactic.

References 

Baseball pitching